Astroboa is a genus of basket stars in the class Ophiuroidea.

Species
These species are included in the genus by the World Register of Marine Species:

Astroboa albatrossi Döderlein, 1927
Astroboa arctos Matsumoto, 1915
Astroboa clavata Lyman, 1861
Astroboa ernae Döderlein, 1911
Astroboa globifera Döderlein, 1902
Astroboa granulatus H.L. Clark, 1938
Astroboa nigrofurcata Döderlein, 1927
Astroboa nuda Lyman, 1874
Astroboa tuberculosa Koehler, 1930

References

Gorgonocephalidae
Ophiuroidea genera